Sagaydachnoye is a rural locality (a selo) in Prokhorovsky District, Belgorod Oblast, Russia. The population was 279 as of 2010. There are 3 streets.

Geography 
Sagaydachnoye is located 14 km east of Prokhorovka (the district's administrative centre) by road. Bobrovo is the nearest rural locality.

References 

Rural localities in Prokhorovsky District